The A2 highway is a highway in Nigeria. It begins at Elele, a town in Rivers State from the junction of roads to the cities of Port Harcourt and Owerri. It proceeds northwesterly though Warri to Benin City, thence northerly via Okene, Kaduna, Zaria and Kano
to the border with the Republic of Niger in the north of the country, connecting with the N10 highway of Niger.

Highways in Nigeria
Niger–Nigeria border crossings